Alfred Freddy Krupa (14 June 1971, Karlovac, Yugoslavia ) is a Croatian painter and book illustrator. He graduated from the University of Zagreb Academy of Fine Arts in 1995. He published New Ink Art Manifesto in 1996. He departed to Tokyo Gakugei University as the very first Croatian painter in 1998.  He first gained fame with the general public in 1990 via the then popular Yugoslav weekly "Vikend/Weekend". Author Milica Jović wrote in her article for New York-based Highlark Magazine that Krupa is considered the pivotal figure in the Western New Ink Art movement.

References

20th-century Croatian painters
Croatian male painters
21st-century Croatian painters
21st-century male artists
Contemporary painters
1971 births
Living people
Croatian atheists
Croatian contemporary artists
Croatian photographers
People from Karlovac
20th-century Croatian male artists